DWLA (105.9 FM), on-air as Neo Retro 1059, is a radio station owned and operated by Bright Star Broadcasting Network. Its studios are located in Southland Estates, Las Piñas, while its transmitter is located at Nuestra Señora de la Paz Subdivision, Brgy. Santa Cruz, Antipolo (sharing tower space with IBC 13). The station operates daily from around 5:00 AM to 12:00 MN and airs 24/7 via online streaming.

History

1992–2000: LA 105.9
The station was initially established on April 1, 1992, as LA 105.9, the first all-rock station under Bright Star Broadcasting Network Corporation (owned by polo patron and Banco Filipino owner Albert "Bobby" Aguirre),  playing Pinoy rock music either amateur or professional.

One of the notable programming of the station under the all-rock format was a weekly chart that saw Teeth's "Laklak" reign for 12 weeks.

In July 1998, LA rebranded as WLA (meaning We Love Adventure) and reformatted into an automated station playing electronic dance music and Top 40. Financial constraints forced WLA 105.9 to sign-off for the last time on November 26, 2000.

2003–2007: Blazin' 105.9
After three years, the station resumed operations as Blazin' 105.9 on October 20, 2003. It was operated by Philippine Hip Hop Awards organizer Empire Entertainment owned by radio veteran  Marcelle John Marcelino (aka DJ Htown), and Cavite businessman - politician Mayor Dino Chua, President of Cavite Broadcasting Network (also the owner of now-defunct 91.9 The Bomb FM in Cavite). Their former studios were located at Culture Club in Eastwood, Libis, Q.C. and RJ Bistro (now in Dusit Hotel), Bel-Air (formerly Club Cello) in Makati City.

Blazin' played all kinds of rap, hip-hop and R&B, including underground hip hop. This was the only FM station in the Philippines to air the 2004–2005 season of the NBA courtesy of another media partner, Solar Sports. This station was a retooled concept of Tagaytay-based Power 108 FM way back in 2001 and in 2005 it became the second revision of Project: Hip Hop.

Blazin' 105.9 also became notable as the producer of the first-ever The Black Eyed Peas concert in the Philippines.

In late 2006, Empire Entertainment subleased the station to Ramon Jacinto's Rajah Broadcasting Network. It became inactive from January to July 2007. Wave 89.1 took over the Pinoy hip hop formatted scene in 2007, creating the 1st Urban Music Awards in 2010.

2007–2011: UR 105.9

On July 15, 2007, 105.9 FM resumed broadcasting with relatively low power transmission. It was later identified as RJ Underground Radio UR 105.9, airing a mainstream rock format. The station became a child station of RJ 100.3 FM, with its image resembling the pre-1986 DZRJ Rock of Manila and even LA 105.9. Like its "parent", it also played three songs in a row featuring a modern rock, classic rock, and a Pinoy rock track, except for some special programs on weekdays and Saturdays, and  Sunday Rock Jam. However, they did not usually feature disc jockeys on weekdays; only public address systems were used, although the station later started to use on-air talent. On Sundays, veteran DJ's from the old RJ Rock of Manila were heard on Sunday Rock Jam. Within a few months, RJ UR improved its transmission to 25,000 watts, though its signal remained unpenetrated in areas far from its transmitter.

Sundays featured legendary DZRJ rockjocks Jamie Evora ("The Spirit"), Hoagy Pardo ("Cousin Hoagy"), Mike Llamas ("Stoney Burke"), and Alfred Gonzalez ('The Madman"), broadcasting from the United States of America. Also, legendary rock DJ Dante David ("Howlin' Dave") made his return on FM radio and the RJ group after a stint with the short-lived & defunct Rock 990 (now Radyo Inquirer 990), with his Sunday afternoon program RJ Pinoy Rock and Rhythm until several health reasons caused his death in May 2008.

After four years, UR management decided to forgo lease on 105.9. On May 28, 2011, UR 105.9 was relaunched & migrated to internet as UR Faceradio. However, the station continued to air the online feed until the end of June. It was later learned that out that four months after it leased airtime, Rajah Broadcasting Network had an issue with the Bright Star Broadcasting Network Corporation due to its illegal use of the network without the permission of the real owner.

2011–2014: Radio High

On July 1, 2011, Hi-Definition Radio Inc. of Mr. Francis Lumen acquired the station's airtime lease for a smooth jazz format. At the same time, it transferred its studios to the 3rd Floor, Silver City Mall, Frontera Verde in Pasig.

On July 14, 2011, it returned to the airwaves as a test broadcast, debuting as Radio High 105.9. It adopted the format of the defunct 923 Joey (now Radyo5 92.3 News FM) and 106.7 Dream FM (now 106.7 Energy FM). It essentially picked up where Dream FM left off. This station used to have quarter-hour segments, each serving its own category, such as Global High for world music, High on the 80s for 80s music, Lite Jazz High for smooth jazz, Natural High for New Age Music, and programs sponsored by McDonald's, Jaguar & Maserati. It also introduced 105.9 Hours of Christmas, which played Christmas music for 106 hours until Christmas Day. This program is eventually picked up by RJFM after its demise.

In February 2014, due to financial losses, Lumen decided to sublease 105.9 FM's airtime to another group. Despite this, the station continued to air the format until March 27, 2014.

2014–2018: Retro 105.9

On March 1, 2014, DCG Radio-TV Network, headed by Joselito Ojeda and Domingo C. Garcia, took over the station's airtime sublease. At the same time, a group of veteran DJs, led by Jonathan "JJ Sparx" Jabson, came up with an innovative radio format that will satisfy the listeners by playing the songs that they grew up with. Teasers were aired throughout the entire month.

On March 28, 2014, at 5:00am, the station was reformatted as Retro 105.9 DCG FM, with Andy Tuna on board on its initial broadcast. The station's format change ensued significant success, gained more listenership and it became an immediate hit with retro music lovers. Due to this, the innovative format, which holds a special spot in a varied class of radio listeners from young adults to mature listeners, was adopted by other stations in other key cities in the Philippines, such as crosstown 104.3 FM2, 103.5 Retro Cebu in Cebu City and Retro 95.5 in Davao City.

On October 20, 2014, the resignation of JJ Sparx left Retro 105.9 without a station manager. Cris Cruise was hired as station consultant. As a result, changes in the DJs' line-up occurred, despite its massive success. Since then, Retro 105.9 developed additional programs, such as Discoteria (replaced by Club Retro), Retro In Love (replaced by Retro Romance) and Quarter Attack.

On October 12, 2015, Willy "Hillbilly Willy" Inong from Wish 1075 was hired as station manager. He left the station on June 4, 2017, due to creative differences.

In almost two years, Retro 105.9 was ranked by Nielsen as the #1 station in the Niche market. This rank would be received by FM2 a year later.

However, by 2017, further changes occurred, starting with the reduction of its terrestrial radio broadcast to 19 hours a day due to transmitter maintenance, continuing its broadcast on internet online streaming after midnight. On November 20, 2017, the DCG FM tag was dropped from its brand. Two weeks prior to this change, most of its DJs were dismissed, leaving the station automated for most of the day, except for its daily newscasts.

On May 25, 2018, at 6:00 PM, Retro 105.9 went off the air unceremoniously. It was later revealed that the DCG Radio-TV Network opted to forgo its sublease with Bright Star after failing to pay their debts.

2018–2019: Like FM
On May 26, 2018, 105.9 FM went back on air as a test broadcast, branding itself officially as Like FM 105.9 with an adult-leaning Top 40 and talk radio format. Jonathan "JJ Sparx" Jabson & Manny "Jimmy Jam" Pagsuyuin, who used to be involved with the previous format, along with a new group of investors, took over the station's airtime. Regular broadcast commenced at 6 am on July 28, 2018.

In February 2019, following the departure of Jabson, Like FM introduced a new tagline, The Best of the '90s and Beyond, albeit retaining its format. It began playing jazz & R&B during late nights.

On July 23, 2019, at 12 midnight, Like FM 105.9 quietly went off the air. A few days prior, it made an announcement regarding its reformat.

2019: Lite FM
On July 24, 2019, the station was reformatted as Lite FM 105.9 with a smooth jazz format, the second time for the station to do so.

By early December, the branding was dropped, and the station underwent transition.

2019-present: Neo Retro
On December 5, 2019, at 4:00 PM, 105.9 rebranded as Neo Retro 1059 and airs an adult hits format. Official broadcast began on January 1, 2020.

In May 2021, the station transferred from Silver City Mall in Pasig to its new home in Southland Estates in Las Piñas.

References

External links
 Official website

Radio stations in Metro Manila
Radio stations established in 1992